Mary Vesta Williams (December 1, 1957 – September 22, 2011) was an American singer-songwriter, who performed across genres such as pop, jazz, adult contemporary and R&B. Originally credited as Vesta Williams, she was simply known as Vesta beginning in the 1990s. She was known for her four–octave vocal range. She once sang "The Star-Spangled Banner" for the Los Angeles Lakers game opener using all four of those octaves. Although Williams never had any albums certified gold nor any Top 40 hits on the Billboard Hot 100, she scored six Top 10 hits on the United States Billboard R&B chart from the mid–1980s to the early–1990s that included "Once Bitten, Twice Shy" (1986), "Sweet Sweet Love" (1988), "Special" (1991), and her 1989 single and signature song, "Congratulations".

Biography
Born in Coshocton, Ohio, United States, Williams' father was a disc jockey. Her family moved from Ohio to Los Angeles in the 1960s. While there, Williams and her three sisters, Margaret, Marte and Marlena, appeared on the television show Jack and Jill as "The Williams Sisters". Later, she returned to Ohio but decided to go back to Los Angeles in order to launch a solo career. Former Fifth Dimension member Ron Townson put Williams in his band Wild Honey. Following that stint, Williams found work as a backup singer, working with artists such as Chaka Khan, Gladys Knight, Sting, Stephanie Mills, Anita Baker and Gordon Lightfoot. Williams sang on the original version of Joe Sample's "The Survivor", and met producer David Crawford while working with his group Klique. After doing session work, she landed a recording contract with A&M Records and her debut album, Vesta, was released in 1986. The album featured her first Top 10 R&B hit "Once Bitten, Twice Shy", which became her only UK hit and performed modestly on the US R&B charts.

Her 1988 release, Vesta 4 U, produced the Top 10 R&B hits "Sweet Sweet Love", "4 U", and "Congratulations", with the latter peaking at #55 on the Hot 100 chart and #5 on the R&B chart. "Congratulations" was Vesta's only single to enter the Hot 100 chart. The album was also her most successful, and her only album to appear on the US Billboard 200, peaking at No. 131. There were persistent rumors that the song was inspired by the dissolution of her long-time relationship with Bruce Willis and that Demi Moore was directly responsible for ending it. In 1991, Williams released her third album entitled Special, with the title track as a single. "Special" became her highest-charting song on the R&B chart at #2, but sales of the album were less than that of Vesta 4 U. Her next album, 1993's Everything-N-More, produced only a minor R&B hit, "Always".

In 1989, Polygram Records purchased A&M Records. Williams' 1998 album Relationships was released under the Polygram name, and it became a modest seller, appearing on the R&B charts. Following the release of Relationships, A&M/Polygram did not renew her contract. Williams continued to work as a session singer, landing spots on albums by such artists as Phil Perry, Howard Hewett, and George Duke. Her voice could be heard by radio listeners in jingles for advertisers that included McDonald's, Nike, Baskin-Robbins, Diet Coke, Revlon and Exxon. That same year, she performed the opening theme to the ABC miniseries, The Women of Brewster Place.

Williams portrayed a saloon singer in the 1993 film Posse, directed by Mario Van Peebles. During this time period she had a hit with the SWV song, "Rain", recorded alongside smooth jazz musician Norman Brown. Williams had a recurring role as "Monica", Jackée Harry's best friend, in the television series Sister, Sister in the 1998–99 season. Her singing voice is featured in the theme song of UPN's Malcolm and Eddie.

In 2000, Polygram released a compilation album, featuring songs from Williams and former A&M artist CeCe Peniston. In 2007, Williams released an album of R&B songs on Shanachie Records entitled Distant Lover. Produced by Chris "Big Dog" Davis, Distant Lover was a cover album featuring songs originally recorded by Bill Withers, Stevie Wonder, Smokey Robinson, Marvin Gaye, Sade, and Deniece Williams.
Her last recording was the song "Dedicated," released on 7 December 2010 on Stimuli Music.

By 2002, Williams had become a radio personality, and was co-hosting a morning show on KRNB in Dallas/Fort Worth. In recent years, Williams had lost 100 pounds, going from size 26 to size 6. It was at this time that Williams became an advocate for the prevention of childhood obesity and juvenile diabetes.

Her final performance occurred on September 17, 2011 in Portsmouth, Virginia at the Autumn Jazz Explosion, just five days before her death.

She was scheduled to perform at the 21st annual "DIVAS Simply Singing!" in Los Angeles on October 22, 2011. Shanice performed "Congratulations" during the show as a tribute to Williams. There was also a tribute to the late singer Teena Marie. Williams was taping an episode of TV One's Unsung at the time of her death. It aired January 2, 2012.

Death
On September 22, 2011, Williams was found dead in a hotel room in El Segundo, California, a suburb of Los Angeles. According to the Los Angeles County Coroner's Office, she was found dead at 6:15 p.m. (PDT), A spokesperson for the coroner's office stated that the autopsy did not say the cause of death. In late December 2011, the family released this statement through singer/producer Norwood Young, reporting her official cause of death: "Following three months of intensive coroner's autopsy and toxicology research, it has been definitively determined that the cause of death for our beloved Vesta was 'natural death' from 'hypertensive heart disease,'" adding: "An enlarged heart can remain undetected for many years."

Vesta Williams was laid to rest at Forest Lawn Memorial Park (Hollywood Hills) on October 4, 2011 following a memorial service at West Angeles Church of God in Christ in Los Angeles, California. Attendees included Wanda Dee, singer Peggi Blu, Freda Payne, Sheryl Lee Ralph, Loretta Devine, Kellita Smith, Norwood Young, Michael Collier, Miki Howard, Karel Bouley, Kiki Shepard, Jackée Harry, Luenell, and renowned blues singer Linda Hopkins. A private reception was held following the interment.

She is survived by her mother, daughter, three sisters, a brother, and three grandchildren.

Discography

Studio albums

Compilation albums
Winning Combinations (with CeCe Peniston) (2000, A&M/Universal)

Singles

Music videos
 Once Bitten Twice Shy
 Something About You
 Don't Blow a Good Thing
 Sweet Sweet Love
 4 U
 Congratulations
 How You Feel
 Special
 Do Ya
 Always
 Somebody for Me
 Dedicated

References

External links

1957 births
2011 deaths
A&M Records artists
Actresses from Ohio
African-American actresses
American film actresses
American funk singers
American soul singers
Burials at Forest Lawn Memorial Park (Hollywood Hills)
People from Coshocton, Ohio
Singers from Ohio
Singers with a four-octave vocal range
American rhythm and blues singers
American disco singers
Ballad musicians
20th-century African-American women singers
21st-century African-American women singers